Tyler Holmes (born July 24, 1988) is a professional Canadian football offensive lineman who is currently a free agent. He most recently played for the Toronto Argonauts of the Canadian Football League (CFL). He played college football for the Tulsa Golden Hurricane.

Professional career
Holmes was drafted by the Argonauts seventh overall in the first round of the 2011 CFL Draft, however, after playing out his college eligibility, he played for the Minnesota Vikings of the National Football League for the 2012 season. After he was cut from the Vikings during their 2013 training camp, he signed with the Argonauts on September 17, 2013. He played in 112 regular season games for the Argonauts where he was twice named a CFL East All-Star. Holmes won his first Grey Cup championship as a member of the 105th Grey Cup winning team. As a pending free agent in 2020, he was released during the free agency negotiation window on February 7, 2020.

References

External links
Toronto Argonauts bio 

1988 births
Living people
Canadian football offensive linemen
Players of Canadian football from Ontario
Canadian football people from Ottawa
Toronto Argonauts players
Tulsa Golden Hurricane football players
American football offensive linemen